Tribute is the fourth and final studio album by American country music artist Roy Rogers, released in 1991 by RCA Records. The album peaked at number 17 on the Billboard Top Country Albums chart.

Track listing

Chart performance

References

1991 albums
Roy Rogers albums
RCA Records albums
Albums produced by Richard Landis